Andy F. Herron (born February 2, 1978) is a Costa Rican footballer.

Club career
Before joining MLS and the Chicago Fire in late in 2004, Herron played two years with Costa Rican Herediano, which he led to Costa Rica's 2004's title, by leading the Costa Rican clausura's tournament with 14 goals and 13 assists. He had joined Herediano after he left Santos de Guápiles in December 2002. Herron had his best season for Chicago in 2006, when the 2006 Budweiser/Fire Golden Boot winner proved his productivity for the "Men in Red" by scoring eight goals in 20 games, with 18 starts. Herron put the team on his shoulders in the team's 2006 Lamar Hunt U.S. Open Cup championship run, scoring four goals and one assist through the competition. His assist and game-winning goal against the Los Angeles Galaxy in the Final at Toyota Park helped the Fire clinch an MLS club-record fourth title to the trophy case.

After two and a half seasons in Chicago, he decided to get back to Club Sport Herediano on a loan from Chicago, but soon after that was sent to Columbus for the second pick in the 2007 MLS SuperDraft (which turned out to be Bakary Soumare) and forward Ryan Coiner. In the MLS Reserve Division he started and played one game for the Crew Reserves, notching one goal in 79 minutes of play.

In February 2008, Herron left Puntarenas and re-signed with Chicago Fire. On November 26, 2008, he was waived by Chicago and he returned to Herediano for the 2009 Verano season. In January 2010 he joined Ramonense and in June 2010 he moved to Guatemala to play for USAC. In summer 2011 he returned to his hometown club after 13 years.

He returned to the United States in January 2012 when he signed with Fort Lauderdale Strikers of the North American Soccer League. In summer 2013 he left Fort Lauderdale to join Atlanta Silverbacks, but left them in August 2013 without any game played for them.

He is now the Concacaf Scout for the Chicago Fire FC.

Controversy
On January 11, 2006, Herron was suspended for six games without pay for his behavior that led to a red card in a 1–0 loss to the New England Revolution during the Eastern Conference Championship game the previous November 6. According to the MLS Soccer Disciplinary Committee, Herron was disciplined for making "unacceptable physical contact" with the referee Terry Vaughn and assistant referee George Gansner, conduct that led to him being sent off in stoppage time. Adding to the severity of his punishment was the fact that Herron returned to the field after the game.

International career
Herron made his debut for Costa Rica in a November 2002 friendly match against Ecuador, also recording his first international goal, and earned a total of 25 caps, scoring 7 goals. He represented his country in 9 FIFA World Cup qualification matches and played at the 2003 UNCAF Nations Cup and 2009 CONCACAF Gold Cup. Being an unmovable striker in Jorge Luis Pinto's squad and scoring the goal which took Costa Rica to the quarterfinals in the 2004 Copa América held in Chile. He tallied 11 goals in eight games with the Costa Rican U-23 squad during Olympic Qualifying from 1999–2000.

His final international was an August 2009 FIFA World Cup qualification match against Honduras.

Personal life
He have three children named Dyan Denilson, Mia Nena and Naya Destiny. He grew up playing in the streets of Puerto Limón, Costa Rica. Herron is a big basketball and Chicago Bulls fan. Currently President of Herron Soccer Academy in Pembroke Pines, FL.
 He lives in Florida with his family.

References

External links
 
 Chicago Fire Bio

1978 births
Living people
People from Limón Province
Association football forwards
Costa Rican footballers
Costa Rica international footballers
2003 UNCAF Nations Cup players
2004 Copa América players
2009 CONCACAF Gold Cup players
Santos de Guápiles footballers
C.S. Herediano footballers
Chicago Fire FC players
Columbus Crew players
Puntarenas F.C. players
A.D. Ramonense players
Universidad de San Carlos players
Fort Lauderdale Strikers players
Atlanta Silverbacks players
Costa Rican expatriate footballers
Expatriate soccer players in the United States
Expatriate footballers in Guatemala
Major League Soccer players
North American Soccer League players
Copa Centroamericana-winning players